Bramsche is a town in the district of Osnabrück, Lower Saxony, Germany. Population is 30,952 (2018).

Subdivisions

In 1971/72 12 previously independent municipalities were included into the town.
Achmer
Balkum
Epe and Malgarten
Engter
Evinghausen
Hesepe
Kalkriese – site of the Battle of the Teutoburg Forest
Lappenstuhl
Pente
Schleptrup
Sögeln
Ueffeln

Mayors
The mayor of Bramsche is Heiner Pahlmann (SPD), re-elected in 2021. He was first elected in May 2014 with 63.0% of the votes. His predecessor Liesel Höltermann (SPD) did not run for mayor any more.

Twin towns – sister cities

Bramsche is twinned with:
 Biskupiec, Poland
 Harfleur, France
 Ra'anana, Israel
 Todmorden, England, United Kingdom

Notable people
Peter Urban (born 1948), radio and television moderator
Marieluise Beck (born 1952), politician (Alliance 90/The Greens), Member of Bundestag since 1983
Filiz Polat (born 1978), politician (Alliance 90/The Greens)
Simon Tüting (born 1986), footballer

References

External links
Official homepage
City Panoramas – Panoramic Views of Bramsche
 es war einmal: Die Hollaender

Towns in Lower Saxony
Osnabrück (district)